Tassinari is an Italian surname. Notable people with the surname include:

Giuseppe Tassinari (1891–1944), Italian politician
Lamberto Tassinari (born 1945), Italian writer and editor
Pia Tassinari (1903–1995), Italian opera singer

Italian-language surnames